Raed Chabab Baladiat Oued Rhiou, known as RCB Oued Rhiou or simply RCBORis an Algerian football club located in Oued Rhiou, Algeria. The club was founded in 1936 and its colours are red and white. Their home stadium, Stade El Maghreb El Arabi, has a capacity of 6,000 spectators. The club is currently playing in the Algerian Ligue 2.

On August 5, 2020, RCB Oued Rhiou promoted to the Algerian Ligue 2.

References

Football clubs in Algeria
Association football clubs established in 1936
1936 establishments in Algeria
Sports clubs in Algeria